"She's Got a Mind of Her Own" is a song written by Billy Livsey and Don Schlitz, and recorded by American country music artist James Bonamy.  It was released on December 26, 1995 as the second single from the album What I Live to Do.  The song reached number 26 on the Billboard Hot Country Singles & Tracks chart.

The song was originally the B-side of the album's debut single "Dog on a Toolbox", but that song was withdrawn early in its chart run.

Chart performance

References

1996 singles
1995 songs
James Bonamy songs
Songs written by Billy Livsey
Songs written by Don Schlitz
Epic Records singles
Song recordings produced by Doug Johnson (record producer)